Chris or Christopher Richards may refer to:

Chris Richards (Australian footballer) (1882–1971), Australian rules footballer
Chris Richards (ice hockey) (born 1975), Canadian ice hockey player
Chris Richards (musician), guitarist
Christopher Richards (born 1961), Canadian actor
Chris Richards (soccer) (born 2000), American soccer player

See also
Chris Richard (disambiguation)